The Rheingau is a region on the northern side of the Rhine between the German towns of Wiesbaden and Lorch near Frankfurt, reaching from the Western Taunus to the Rhine.  It is situated in the German state of Hesse and is part of the Rheingau-Taunus-Kreis administrative district.  It is famous for Rheingau wines, especially the "Rheingauer Riesling," and its many taverns.

History
The Rheingau was as a Gau or county of the Frankish Empire, bordered by the Niddagau, the Maingau, the Oberrheingau, and the Lahngau; the counts of the Rheingau were known as Rhinegraves. The first Rhinegrave on record is Hato VI (937–960).

In 983, Otto II, Holy Roman Emperor, gave the Rheingau, together with other territories, to the Archbishopric of Mainz during the Diet of Verona. When the Archbishopric was dissolved in 1806, the Rheingau was given to the Duchy of Nassau.

Following the marriage between  John III (1383–1428) and Adelheid, scion of the Wildgraves of Kyrburg, John V (1476–95) inherited several territories in the Obersalm Wasgau, to the left of the Rhine (from the Nahegau, on the river Nahe and in the Alsace) from the Wildgraves and the counts of Salm, and these territories were also linked to their name, with the counts using the title "Wild- and Rhinegraves of Salm".

Gallery

Events 
The Rheingau Musik Festival takes place every year in July and August [[List of Rheingau Musik Festival locations|in many locations}} throughout the region.
The Rheingau Wine Festival takes place in Wiesbaden every year in August.
Most towns celebrate their own annual wine festival.

References

External links 

 German wine regions: Rheingau

1866 disestablishments
States and territories established in the 930s
Former states and territories of Hesse
Carolingian counties
Upper Rhine